Clarion-Limestone Jr/Sr High School is a public Junior/Senior High School, in Strattanville, central Clarion County, Pennsylvania, with 522 students in grades 7-12

Graduation requirements
A student from C-L needs to obtain 24 credits  in Grades 9-12, and satisfactorily complete their Graduation Projecet, as well as the PSSA's in order to graduate.

Credit structure

Courses available
According to the curriculum guide, there are nearly 100 courses available to the student at C-L.
 English
 Mathematics
 Science
 Social Studies
 Foreign Language - Including French and Spanish
 Business Technology - Including Multimedia and Webpage
 Family and Consumer Sciences
 Industrial Arts - Including Ag Mechanics, Metal Shop, Woodshop, and Drafting
 Art
 Music
 Physical Education - Freshman and Sophomores take PE Each Day for a quarter of the school term., while Juniors and Seniors take PE every other day for a semester.
 Driver's Education

Athletics 
Clarion-Limestone participates in District IX  (9) of the Pennsylvania Interscholastic Athletic Association, or PIAA

Clubs and activities 
C-L offers the following clubs and activities 
Academic Sports League
Art Club
Band
Bible Club
Drama Club
Envirothon
French Club
FFA
Future Teachers of America
Green Imprints
Junior Historians
National Honor Society
Spanish Club
Student Council
Webpage
Yearbook

References 

Public middle schools in Pennsylvania
Public high schools in Pennsylvania
Schools in Clarion County, Pennsylvania
1936 establishments in Pennsylvania